Christine Joy Watmough (born 22 March 1947) is an English former cricketer who played primarily as a left-handed batter. She appeared in 13 Test matches and 28 One Day Internationals for England between 1968 and 1985. She was a member of the England team that won the inaugural World Cup in 1973. She played domestic cricket for Kent and Surrey.

References

External links
 

1947 births
Living people
Cricketers from Preston, Lancashire
England women Test cricketers
England women One Day International cricketers
Kent women cricketers
Surrey women cricketers